The 1973–74 North American Hockey League season was the first season of the North American Hockey League. Seven teams participated in the regular season, and the Syracuse Blazers were the league champions.

Regular season

Lockhart Cup-Playoffs

Qualification 

Note: Syracuse-Long Island game was ruled a no contest following a brawl.

External links
 Statistics on hockeydb.com

North American Hockey League (1973–1977) seasons
NAHL